Saint-Jean-de-Côle (literally Saint-Jean of Côle; Limousin: Sent Joan de Còla) is a commune in the Dordogne department in Nouvelle-Aquitaine in southwestern France.

Geography
The Côle flows south-southwest through the middle of the commune and crosses the village.

Population

See also
Communes of the Dordogne department

References

Communes of Dordogne
Plus Beaux Villages de France